Crossflatts railway station serves the Crossflatts area of Bingley, north of Bradford in West Yorkshire, England. The station, and all trains serving it, are operated by Northern.

The station was opened on 17 May 1982 at a cost of £78,000.  It was the first of the eighties-era stations on the Airedale Line to be opened and is the only one to be built by British Rail on an entirely new site (the others - such as Saltaire and Frizinghall - had all previously been closed in 1965 as part of the Beeching cuts).

It is used heavily during school term time due to its proximity to Bingley Grammar School.

Facilities
The station is unstaffed, but there are ticket machines available.  Step-free access to both platforms is via ramps from the main road.  Digital passenger information screens, timetable poster boards and an automated announcement system are installed to provide train running details.

Services

There is a half-hourly service to Leeds, an hourly service to Bradford Forster Square and three trains per hour to Skipton throughout the day on weekdays and Saturdays. The first daily departure from Leeds to  stops here on weekdays (as does the evening  to Leeds service), but other longer distance services run through without calling here.

On Sundays there is an hourly service to Leeds and to Bradford Forster Square, with two trains per hour to Skipton. The first departures of the day from Leeds to both Morecambe & Carlisle also call.

Notes

External links

Railway stations in Bradford
DfT Category F1 stations
Railway stations opened by British Rail
Railway stations in Great Britain opened in 1982
Northern franchise railway stations
Buildings and structures in Bingley
1982 establishments in England